The Russian Third Army was a World War I Russian field army that fought on the Eastern theatre of war.

Field management was established in July 1914 at the headquarters of the Kiev Military District. The unit was disbanded in the beginning of 1918. At the beginning of the war the 3rd Army was composed of the IX, X, XI, XXI Army Corps.

A detachment of two aircraft  "Ilya Muromets" was based at the Bereza airfield, from the 4th aviation company based at the airfield Lida. The detachment operated jointly with the 3rd Army from February 1915 and, in addition to Bereza, was also based at airfields in Brest-Litovsk and Slutsk.

Military Fronts in which the 3rd Army participated 

 Southwestern Front (July 1914 – June 1915)
 Northwestern Front (June–Aug. 1915)
 Western Front (August 1915 – June 1916)
 Southwestern Front (June–July 1916)
 Western Front (July 1916 – the beginning of 1918)

Mobilisation
The Third Army was originally based in Dubno. It comprised four Army Corps and three cavalry divisions, with the 3rd Caucasian Division joining them later. They were part of the invasion of Galicia, with the first stop for the staff officers was at Penyaki where they were made welcome by the servants of a house owned by a major in the Austrian Army. The building was set on fire by unknown people following their departure for Zolochev. Here the Army HQ was accommodated in a three-storey stone building which had previously been a bank.

Engagements
 Battle of Gnila Lipa (26–30 August, 1914)
 Battle of Limanowa (1–13 December, 1914)

Commanders
 19.07.1914 – 03.09.1914 — General of Infantry Nikolai Ruzsky
 03.09.1914 – 20.05.1915 — General of Infantry Radko Dimitriev
 03.06.1915 – 03.08.1917 — General of Infantry Leonid Lesh
 03.08.1917 – 11.08.1917 — Lieutenant-General Mikhail Kvetsinsky
 11.08.1917 – 09.09.1917 — Lieutenant-General Januarius Tsikhovich
 12.09.1917 – 09.10.1917 — Lieutenant-General Ilia Odishelidze
 09.09.1917 – 08.11.1917 — Lieutenant-General Dmitri Parsky
 08.11.1917 — Sergey Anuchin

See also
 List of Imperial Russian Army formations and units

References

Armies of the Russian Empire
Military units and formations established in 1914
1914 establishments in the Russian Empire
Military units and formations disestablished in 1918